The System is a 2014 Pakistani Urdu-language action drama film, directed by Norway-based Shahzad Ghufoor, produced by Ghafoor Butt of Leos Productions (Norway). Nadeem Baig, Shafqat Cheema, Irfan Khoosat, and Nayyar Ejaz play the lead roles.

The film is set in a neighbourhood in Lahore and telescopes out from the everyday lives of a middle-class family to expose local corruption.

Plot 
The story is about a lower middle-class boy Haider Ali (Sheraz) who is the son of a Pesh Imam (Nadeem Baig). He is in love with his neighborhood girl Sara (Kashaf Ali). Haider's uncle (Irfan Khoosat) is a normal government officer who does not consider taking bribes to be a sin. Haider gets hooked by the local SHO (Shafqat Cheema) in a mob firing case. Ultimately after getting away with this case, Haider's life takes a drastic change. Haider now sees the bigger and bitter picture of the current system, and how it affects everybody. He decides to do something about this system, and in the process, his education, family, friends and  love are at stake.

Cast 
 Sheraz Ghufoor as Haider Ali 
 Kashaf Ali - Sara
 Nadeem Baig - Pesh Imam (Haider's father)
 Irfan Khoosat - Haider's uncle
 Shafqat Cheema - corrupt SHO
 Nayyar Ejaz - corrupt minister
 Mariyam Ali Hussiain - dancer
 Ejaz Hussain Bugti 
 Rabia Tabassum
 Sufian Bhatti
 Saleem Shah
 Saima Saleem
 Saira

Music 
Four songs on the soundtrack were produced in India. The music director was Shailesh Suvarna, with poetry from Bollywood's lyricist Irfan Siddiqui and Mohit Pathak. The tracks included several leading singers such as Javed Ali, Komal Rizvi, Palak Muchhal, Mohit Pathak and Krishna Beura. Two of the film's song videos were shot in Norway.

Release 
The film was premiered on 29 May 2014 in, Lahore and released countrywide on 59 screens on 30 May. The film was also released in Norway on 13 June.

See also
 List of highest-grossing Pakistani films
 List of Pakistani films of 2014

References

Reviews

External links 
 
 
 

Pakistani action drama films
Films shot in Norway
Films shot in Lahore
Lollywood films